Jonathan Parker is an American politician. He is a former Idaho Republican Party Chairman and Executive Director.

Early life and education
Parker grew up in Spokane, Washington. He attended Joel E Ferris High School. Parker graduated from the University of Idaho with a degree in political science. He then pursued a master's degree in Pastoral Ministries at Rhema Bible College in Tulsa, Oklahoma.

Career and personal life
Parker was with the Idaho Water Users Association in the early 2000s. He served as Congressman Bill Sali District Director in 2007.

Parker was with the Boise office of the Holland and Hart law firm from July 2012 to 2018, Parker served as the Idaho director of government affairs for firm.

Political career
Parker served as campaign manager for Joe Stegner’s successful reelection campaign for the Idaho State Senate and in Norm Semanko's campaign for Idaho's 1st congressional district election, 2006.

Parker served as campaign strategist to Bill Sali re election campaign.

Parked served as senior advisor to  Donna Jones election to Idaho state controller in 2006.

Parker served as the Chairman, National Committeeman, and Secretary of the Idaho Young Republican Federation.

Idaho Republican Party 
In 2009, Parker was selected by Chairman Norm Semanko to serve as executive director. During his tenure, the Idaho Republican Party had its most successful election year (2010) up until that time. All Republicans were reelected to Statewide office, Walt Minnick, Democratic Congressman in the Idaho's 1st congressional district, was defeated, and Republicans won an additional five seats in the Idaho Legislature. For his work Parker was elected to the Idaho GOP Hall of Fame. 

Parker was elected Idaho Republican Party chairman on July 22, 2017. Parker was elected to fill the position when Steve Yates, the former chairman, stepped down in April, 2017. Parker was re elected with unanimous consent on June 29, 2018. Parker resigned February 20, 2019, citing a need to spend more time as a father.

References

Idaho Republicans
Living people
State political party chairs of Idaho
University of Idaho alumni
Year of birth missing (living people)
Idaho politicians convicted of crimes